In Transit may refer to:
In Transit (Saga album), released in 1982
In Transit (Covenant album), released in 2007
In Transit (film), a 2008 film directed by Tom Roberts
In Transit (2015 film), a documentary film directed by Albert Maysles, Lynn True, David Usui, Nelson Walker and Benjamin Wu
In Transit (musical), a musical play by Kristen Anderson-Lopez
In Transit (NY1), a cancelled news program on NY1 about public transportation issues in New York City